Statistics of UAE Football League for the 2007–08 season.

Overview
It was contested by 12 teams, and Al-Shabab (United Arab Emirates) won the championship.

League standings

Top goalscorers
Source: goalzz.com

16 goals
 Faisal Khalil (Al-Ahli)
 Anderson Barbosa (Sharjah)

15 goals
 Mehrzad Madanchi (Al-Shaab)

14 goals
 André Dias (Al Wasl)
 Rasoul Khatibi (Emirates Club)

12 goals
 Reza Enayati (Emirates Club)

12 goals
 Antonin Koutouan (Al-Jazira)
 Ali Samereh (Al-Shaab)

11 goals
 Ousman Jallow (Al Ain)

10 goals
 Clederson (Al-Ahli)
 Renato Abreu (Al-Nasr)

References
United Arab Emirates - List of final tables (RSSSF)

UAE Pro League seasons
United
1